The Indigenous peoples in Northern Canada consist of the First Nations, Métis, and Inuit located in Canada's three territories: Northwest Territories, Nunavut, and Yukon.

Inuit communities

Northwest Territories
All Inuit communities in the Northwest Territories are part of the Inuvialuit Settlement Region.
 Aklavik
 Inuvik
 Paulatuk
 Sachs Harbour
 Tuktoyaktuk
 Ulukhaktok

Nunavut
Arctic Bay (Ikpiarjuk ᐃᒃᐱᐊᕐᔪᒃ)
Arviat (ᐊᕐᕕᐊᑦ)
Baker Lake (Qamanittuaq, ᖃᒪᓂᑦᑐᐊᖅ)
Bathurst Inlet (Kingoak)
Cambridge Bay (Iqaluktuuttiaq)
Chesterfield Inlet (Igluligaarjuk, ᐃᒡᓗᓕᒑᕐᔪᒃ)
Clyde River (Kangiqtugaapik, ᑲᖏᖅᑐᒑᐱᒃ)
Coral Harbour (Salliit, ᓴᓪᓖᑦ)
Gjoa Haven (Uqsuqtuuq, ᐅᖅᓱᖅᑑᖅ)
Grise Fiord (Aujuittuq, ᐊᐅᔪᐃᑦᑐᖅ)
Igloolik (Iglulik, ᐃᒡᓗᓕᒃ)
Iqaluit (territorial capital) (ᐃᖃᓗᐃᑦ)
Kimmirut (ᑭᒻᒥᕈᑦ)
Kinngait (ᑭᙵᐃᑦ)
Kugaaruk (Kuugaarjuk, ᑰᒑᕐᔪᒃ or Kuugaarruk, ᑰᒑᕐᕈᒃ )
Kugluktuk (Qurluqtuq)
Pangnirtung (Pangniqtuuq, ᐸᖕᓂᖅᑑᖅ)
Pond Inlet (Mittimatalik, ᒥᑦᑎᒪᑕᓕᒃ)
Qikiqtarjuaq (ᕿᑭᖅᑕᕐᔪᐊᖅ)
Rankin Inlet (Kangiqiniq, ᑲᖏᕿᓂᖅ or Kangirliniq, ᑲᖏᖅᖠᓂᖅ)
Naujaat (ᓇᐅᔮᑦ)
Resolute (Qausuittuq, ᖃᐅᓱᐃᑦᑐᖅ)
Sanikiluaq, (ᓴᓂᑭᓗᐊᖅ)
Sanirajak (ᓴᓂᕋᔭᒃ)
Taloyoak (Talurjuaq, ᑕᓗᕐᔪᐊᖅ)
Umingmaktok (Umingmaktuuq)
Whale Cove (Tikirarjuaq, ᑎᑭᕋᕐᔪᐊᖅ)

First Nations

See also 
 List of indigenous peoples

Further reading 
 

 
Indigenous peoples in the Arctic
Northern Canada